Arethusa may refer to:

Mythology 
 Arethusa (mythology), a nereid nymph who became a fountain
 Arethusa, one of the Hesperides nymphs

Places 
 Arethusa (Mygdonia), an ancient city in Mygdonia of ancient Macedonia
 Arethusa, ancient name of Al-Rastan, Syria
 Arethusa (see), a titular see of Syria near Apamea
 Arethuse, a fountain in Ortygia, Sicily, named from the above nereid
 Arethousa, a municipal unit in the Thessaloniki regional unit, Greece
 Arethousa, Ikaria, a village on the Greek island Ikaria
 Arethusa Falls, one of the highest waterfalls in New Hampshire, USA
 Antipatris, refounded in 64–63 BC by Pompey as Arethusa

Maritime 
 Arethusa-class cruiser (disambiguation), two classes of Royal Navy cruiser
 Arethusa-class cruiser (1913), eight light cruisers built in 1912–1914 that served in World War I
 Arethusa-class cruiser (1934), four light cruisers built in 1934–1936 that served in World War II
 Aréthuse-class submarine, a class of French submarine, in service 1958-1981
 , nine ships of the Royal Navy, 1759 to 1991
The Saucy Arethusa, a ballad about the action of 17 June 1778
 Three training ships operated by the Shaftesbury Homes and Arethusa charity
 Arethusa, formerly HMS Arethusa (1849)
 Arethusa II,(1932-1975), formerly Peking (ship)
 Arethusa III, a much smaller ketch used as a training ship
 , three ships of the United States Navy 1864 to 1946

Science 
 Arethusa (plant), a monospecific genus of orchids (Dragon's mouth, Arethusa bulbosa)
 Arethusa De Montfort, 1808, a foram
 Arethusa Barrande, 1846, the occupied name for a trilobite, now renamed to Aulacopleura
Arethusa Oken, 1815, a synonym for the Portuguese man o' war
Arethusa caravell Oken, 1815, a synonym for the Portuguese man o' war
 95 Arethusa, an asteroid

Other 
 Arethusa (journal), an academic journal
 Arethusa, a poem by Percy Bysshe Shelley
 Aretousa, a main character in the early 17th century romance Erotokritos
 Arethusa, the writer of a letter in Propertius, 4.3 ('Arethusa sends these instructions to her lycotas,')
 Shaftesbury Homes and Arethusa, one of the oldest charities dealing with children in the United Kingdom
 Arethusa, a residential activities centre in Upnor, Kent, run by Shaftesbury Homes and Arethusa

See also
Arethusana